Possibly the best-known 12-bit CPU is the PDP-8 and its relatives, such as the Intersil 6100 microprocessor produced in various forms from August 1963 to mid-1990. Many analog to digital converters (ADCs) have a 12-bit resolution. Some PIC microcontrollers use a 12-bit word size.

12 binary digits, or 3 nibbles (a 'tribble'), have 4096 (10000 octal, 1000 hexadecimal) distinct combinations. Hence, a microprocessor with 12-bit memory addresses can directly access 4096 words (4 kW) of word-addressable memory. At a time when six-bit character codes were common a 12-bit word, which could hold two characters, was a convenient size. IBM System/360 instruction formats use a 12-bit displacement field which, added to the contents of a base register, can address 4096 bytes of memory.

List of 12-bit computer systems
 Digital Equipment Corporation
 PDP-5
 PDP-8
 DECmate, a personal computer based on the Intersil 6100
 PDP-12
 PDP-14
 Ford EEC I automotive engine control unit
 Toshiba TLCS-12 microprocessor
 Intersil IM6100 microprocessor (PDP-8-compatible)
 Control Data Corporation
 CDC 160 series computers
 CDC 6600 - Peripheral Processor (PP)
 National Cash Register NCR 315
 Scientific Data Systems SDS 92
 Nuclear Data, Inc. ND812
 PC12 minicomputer
 Ferranti Argus
 LINC, later commercialized by DEC as the LINC-8
 Electronic Arrays 9002 (12-bit addressing but 8-bit byte)

See also
FAT12, a file system with 12-bit wide cluster entries

References

External links 
 DIGITAL Computing Timeline: 12-bit architecture

Computer data